Penor is a small town in Kuantan District, Pahang, Malaysia. Located near the Kuantan-Pekan district border, it is accessible by the  Tanjung Lumpur Highway (Federal Route 183). Penor houses the jail of Pahang, Penor Jail, which is Penor's landmark. Apart from the jail, Penor is famous among locals for its calm beach and also as a fishing spot.

References

Kuantan District
Towns in Pahang